Eugeniusz Pogorzelski (December 30, 1866 – March 18, 1934) was a Polish military officer. Serving in the rank of Generał dywizji, he was the commanding officer of the Polish 7th Infantry Division during the Kiev Offensive of the Polish-Bolshevik War.

Sources
 Tadeusz Kryska-Karski, Stanisław Żurakowski, 1991: Generałowie Polski Niepodległej. Warszawa: Editions Spotkania
 Henryk P. Kosk, 2001: Generalicja polska. Vol. 2: M–Ż. Pruszków: Oficyna Wydawnicza "Ajaks". 

Polish generals
1866 births
1934 deaths
People from Gostynin County